Kantemirovka (earlier Konstantinovka) is an urban locality (an urban-type settlement) in Kantemirovsky District of Voronezh Oblast, Russia. Population: 

Founded in 18 century and named after its landowners Constantin Cantemir and his son Dimitrie Cantemir of the Moldavian former ruling Cantemirești family who, to free their land from Ottoman empire, sided with Russia's Peter I's army, and, when the Russian side lost, moved to Russia and were included in Russian nobility. Dimitrie was a philosopher and writer, as well as a musician, and his son Antioch a prominent Russian author. In the 19th century the village was the center of Konstantinovskaya volost, Bogucharsky Uyezd, Voronezh Governorate.

In 1942, during World War II, there was heavy fighting for Kantemirovka's railway station. Kantemirovka was under German occupation from 10 July 1942 until 19 December 1942,  with Red Army tank units of the Southwestern Front finally freeing it from German troops on December 19.

References

Urban-type settlements in Voronezh Oblast